is a railway station in northern Kobe, Japan, serving the Shintetsu Arima Line and the Kobe Municipal Subway Hokushin Line.

Layout
Tanigami Station consists of five tracks and three island platforms.

Platforms

Adjacent stations
Kobe Electric Railway
Arima Line

 (KB08) ← Tanigami (KB10) ←  (KB22)

Yamanomachi (KB08) - Tanigami (KB10) -  (KB12)
 / 
 (KB09) - Tanigami (KB10) -  (KB11)

External links
 Kobe Electric Railway
 Kobe Municipal Subway

Railway stations in Hyōgo Prefecture
Stations of Kobe Electric Railway
Railway stations in Japan opened in 1928